The Big Year is a 2011 American comedy film starring Jack Black, Owen Wilson and Steve Martin, directed by David Frankel and written by Howard Franklin. The film was based on the 2004 non-fiction book The Big Year: A Tale of Man, Nature and Fowl Obsession by Mark Obmascik. The book follows three men on a quest for a Big Year – a competition among birders to see who can spot and identify the greatest number of bird species in North America (north of Mexico) in a calendar year. The three actual birders were Sandy Komito, Al Levantin, and Greg Miller, who were chasing Komito's prior record. The film uses the same premise with fictional characters.

Filming for The Big Year took place from May to July 2010. The film was released on October 14, 2011, in the United States. It was released in the United Kingdom on December 2, 2011.

Plot
The film follows three seasoned birders who each set out to achieve a Big Year. They are Brad Harris, a 36-year-old computer programmer based in Baltimore; Stu Preissler, founder and CEO of a New York company bearing his name; and a roofing contractor named Kenny Bostick, who holds the current Big Year record of 732 birds.

Bostick is obsessively possessive of his record, but his third wife Jessica is concerned; this was supposed to be the year they focused on conceiving a child. She also believes that Bostick's birding obsession is what destroyed his two previous marriages. He is so competitive that the others use his name as a kind of expletive: "Bostick!"

Brad is a skilled birder who can identify nearly any species solely by sound. He hates his job maintaining the operational software of a nuclear power plant in Lansdowne, Pennsylvania. Living with his parents after a failed marriage, an aborted career at Dell, and dropping out of grad school, he hopes that doing a Big Year will give him a sense of purpose and possibly even make his father proud of him.

Stu is the founder and CEO of an enormous Manhattan-based chemical conglomerate which he built from the ground up, starting in his garage. After decades of corporate success, he is ready to retire to Colorado with his architect wife. Fear of an empty schedule led him to come back from a previous retirement, but now he wants to leave his company in the hands of his two lieutenants. The company is in the middle of complicated negotiations to merge with a competitor, so his two anointed successors keep calling him back to New York for important meetings; to some extent he is a prisoner of his own success. A Big Year has been his lifelong dream and he's pursuing it with the full support of his wife.

The movie portrays various incidents that take place during the Big Year event, while the trio compete with each other and many other birders to achieve the world record of sighting the highest number of birds. Brad and Stu become friends and help each other in the competition, and Brad is attracted to a fellow birder, Ellie. Meanwhile, the highly competitive Bostick resorts to dirty tricks to boost his own count while undermining the others.

As the year draws to a close, Stu is happily retired and enjoying his newborn grandson; Brad develops a relationship with Ellie; and Bostick is alone, as his wife has left him. Stu and Brad, now close friends, congratulate each other on "a very big year", after each sighting 700+ bird species that year. When the Big Year results are published, Bostick won the competition with 755, a new record; Brad came in second; Stu was fourth. Brad opines that "he (Bostick) got more birds, but we got more everything," as he looks at Ellie, who has come for a weekend visit. Stu smiles, looking at his wife.

The film ends with Brad and Ellie birding together on a rocky coastline, while Brad confesses that birding is no longer the biggest part of his life. Stu is hiking with his toddler grandson (already enamored by birds) in the Rockies. Bostick is on a birding adventure in China, alone and gazing wistfully at a happy couple walking with their newborn child.

Cast

Steve Martin as Stu Preissler
Jack Black as Brad Harris
Owen Wilson as Kenny Bostick
Rashida Jones as Ellie
Anjelica Huston as Annie Auklet
Jim Parsons as Crane
Rosamund Pike as Jessica
JoBeth Williams as Edith
Brian Dennehy as Raymond
Dianne Wiest as Brenda
Anthony Anderson as Bill Clemont
Tim Blake Nelson as Phil
Joel McHale as Barry Loomis
Calum Worthy as Colin Debs
Veena Sood as Nurse Katie
Corbin Bernsen as Gil Gordon
Stacey Scowley as Vicki
Jesse Moss as Darren
Kevin Pollak as Jim Gittelson
Barry Shabaka Henley as Dr. Neil Kramer
Andrew Wilson as Mike Shin
Al Roker as New York weatherman
John Cleese as narrator
June Squibb as the Old Lady 
Steven Weber as Rick

Production
Principal photography was done from May 3 to July 30, 2010 in Vancouver. Jack Black's fall on Attu Island was unscripted.

Reception
The film received mixed reviews from critics. The Hollywood Reporter described it as a "genial, amusing and somewhat unfathomable" film; the Pittsburgh Post-Gazette called it a "gentle, light-hearted comedy" about "people trying to be the best, following their dreams and enjoying the wonder of birds". The consensus reads: "Though made with care and affection for its characters, The Big Year plods along, rarely reaching any comedic heights." CinemaScore polls reported that the average grade moviegoers gave the film was a "B−" on an A+ to F scale.

The film was a box office failure, despite the established stars like Martin, Jack Black and Owen Wilson as the leads. Based on a budget of $41 million, it took in just $7.4 million in ticket sales worldwide according to Box Office Mojo.

Songs

Soundtrack references:

See also
 List of birdwatchers

References

External links
 
 
 
 
 

2011 films
2011 comedy films
2010s American films
2010s English-language films
20th Century Fox films
American comedy films
Birdwatching
Films about birds
Films about competitions
Dune Entertainment films
Films based on non-fiction books
Films directed by David Frankel
Films scored by Theodore Shapiro
Films shot in Alaska
Films shot in British Columbia
Films shot in Georgia (U.S. state)
Films shot in Yukon
Films with screenplays by Howard Franklin
Red Hour Productions films